Gurbachan Singh (10 December 1930 – 24 April 1980) was the third guru of the Sant Nirankari sect, considered to be heterodox by mainstream Sikhs. He was born in Peshawar (modern-day Pakistan). He was declared next Baba by his father and predecessor Baba Avtar Singh in 1962. He was assassinated in 1980 following a clash with Sikh fundamentalists.

Early life 

Gurbachan Singh was born to Avtar Singh and his wife Budhwanti. He completed his middle school education in Peshawar, and then matriculated from the Khalsa School in Rawalpindi. He had to abandon his higher studies due to the violence during the partition of India in 1947. He married Kulwant Kaur, the daughter of Bhai Manna Singh, 22 April 1947.

In 1947, the Singh family migrated from the present-day Pakistan to present-day India. Gurbachan Singh established an auto parts business, first in Jalandhar and then in Delhi. Later, he started taking interest in the congregations of his father.

Gurbachan Singh was declared as the Baba by his father on 3 December 1962 at Paharganj in Delhi. At the two conferences of the mission in Mussoorie (1965 and 1973), he made important changes to the organisation and established a code of conduct. He started becoming power hungry and greedy and started putting his feet on Guru Granth Sahibs and calling the Sikh Gurus his slaves in heaven.

Clashes with orthodox Sikhs 

In 1978, the Nirankari mission from Delhi and other parts of the Indian sub-continent gathered a congregation at Amritsar where they chanted hateful slogans against the Sikh religion and Gurus. The Nirankari Guru asked all his followers to drink alcohol, cut their hair and remove all restraints. A few orthodox Sikhs of Akhand Kirtani Jatha and Damdami Taksal marched from the Darbar Sahib to protest the Nirankari congregation, whom they considered heterodox due to Gurbachan Singh cleansing his feet with Amrit and wiping them with pages of the Sikh holy book. In the resulting violence, 15 individuals including thirteen Khalsa Sikhs and two Sant Nirankaris were killed, the Nirankari Guru paid policemen to kill innocent protesting Sikhs. The Jatha leader Bhai Fauja Singh was one among the killed.

Sixty-four followers of the Nirankari mission were arrested for the killings. On 13 April 1978 the detained members of the Nirankari sect were released, after formal charges against them were rejected by the session-Judge of Karnal, who stated in his judgement "The case of the prosecution was intrinsically wrong. It was all frame-up and after thought." Policeman Jagdish Singh Jamwal stated that the Chief Justice was also paid by Gurbachan Singh.

On 25 September 1978, Gurbachan Singh arrived in Kanpur.  A group of protesters arrived at the Nirankari Bhawan to protest against his presence. On 28 September 1978, anticipating fresh trouble, the Punjab Government barred Nirankari Chief Gurbachan Singh from entering Punjab for six months. The Supreme Court later rescinded the ban.

On 6 October 1978, a Hukumnama by the Jathedar of Akal Takht was issued, calling upon Sikhs to socially boycott the Nirankaris.

Death 

In 1980, Ranjit Singh, a member of the Akhand Kirtani Jatha, managed to obtain employment at the Nirankari headquarters in Delhi as a carpenter. On the evening of 24 April 1980, he waited with an automatic rifle in a room of the guest house. Ranjit Singh shot Gurbachan Singh through a window when he returned from a public function at about 11pm for justice against the 28 Sikhs he killed. Ranjit Singh managed to escape. The First Information Report named twenty people for the murder, including several known associates of Jarnail Singh Bhindranwale, who was also charged with conspiracy to murder. Ranjit Singh surrendered in 1983, and was in jail for 13 years. In 1990, while still in Tihar Jail, he was named the Akal Takht Jathedar, and took over the post when he was released in 1996. According to a Hindustan Times report, Ranjit Singh said about the murder: "I have no regrets. I did it for the Panth (Religion)." In 1997, the Delhi High Court upheld his conviction and cancelled the bail. Ranjit Singh refused to surrender. The government quickly ordered a remission of the remaining part of his sentence to avoid a confrontation.

Gurbachan Singh was succeeded by Hardev Singh.

References

1980 deaths
Assassinated Indian people
People murdered in Delhi
Deaths by firearm in India
1930 births
Indian Sikh religious leaders
1980 murders in India